Marcotte is a French surname, Marcotte originally came from an Old French word, and the root of the word Marcotte translates to "Vineshoot forming a layer'. ...’. The word Marcotte became known a surname for someone who either grows grapes and or tends to vineyards. The surname Marcotte was more common in the rural areas of France where vineyard grapes were grown. 

As for Marcotte in the New World, we have a detailed history of the family origins starting with Charles Emile Marcotte, 1599 - 1678 and his brother 

Amanda Marcotte (born 1977), American blogger
Arthur Marcotte (1873–1958), Canadian lawyer and political figure
Bruno Marcotte (born 1974), Canadian figure skater and coach
Charles Marcotte (1844–1901), Canadian notary and political figure
Don Marcotte (born 1947), Canadian ice hockey player
Edward Marcotte, American professor of biochemistry
François Arthur Marcotte (1866–1931), Canadian physician and political figure
Michael J. Marcotte (born 1958), American politician
Michael (Mike) Marcotte (born 1971), American technology leader
Pierre-Léandre Marcotte (1837–1899), Canadian farmer and political figure
Thomas A Marcotte (born 1961), American Pharmaceutical Brand Manager